Fabro or Del Fabro is a surname. Notable people with the surname include: 

Cornelio Fabro (1911–1995), Italian Catholic priest
Dario Del Fabro (born 1995), Italian footballer
Darwin Del Fabro, Brazilian actor
Luciano Fabro (1936–2007), Italian sculptor, artist, and writer

See also
Fabri

Italian-language surnames